Harry "Dane" Dastillung (April 2, 1897 – November 30, 1982) was an American football lineman who played one season with the Cincinnati Celts of the American Professional Football Association. He first enrolled at Marietta College before transferring to the Xavier University.

References

External links
Just Sports Stats

1897 births
1982 deaths
Players of American football from Cincinnati
American football guards
American football tackles
Marietta Pioneers football players
Xavier Musketeers football players
Cincinnati Celts players